Qaleh Now-e Mirza Jafar (also Romanized as Qal‘eh Now-e Mīrzā Ja‘far and Qal‘eh Now Mīrzā Ja‘far) is a village in Mian Jam Rural District, in the Central District of Torbat-e Jam County, Razavi Khorasan Province, Iran. At the 2006 census, its population was 614, in 138 families.

References 

Populated places in Torbat-e Jam County